Patrik Demjén (born 22 March 1998 in Esztergom) is a Hungarian football player who currently plays for Zalaegerszegi TE.

Career statistics
.

References

External links

1998 births
Living people
People from Esztergom
Hungarian footballers
Hungary youth international footballers
Association football goalkeepers
MTK Budapest FC players
Dorogi FC footballers
Budaörsi SC footballers
Zalaegerszegi TE players
Nemzeti Bajnokság I players
Sportspeople from Komárom-Esztergom County
21st-century Hungarian people